Einar Sigurðsson (born 2 July 1971) is an Icelandic former handball player who competed in the 1992 Summer Olympics.

References

1971 births
Living people
Einar Sigurdsson
Einar Sigurdsson
Handball players at the 1992 Summer Olympics